Cyclops (Scott Summers) is a fictional character, a superhero appearing in American comic books published by Marvel Comics and is a founding member of the X-Men. Created by writer Stan Lee and artist/co-plotter Jack Kirby, the character first appeared in the comic book The X-Men. Cyclops is a member of a subspecies of humans known as mutants, who are born with superhuman abilities. Cyclops emits powerful beams of energy from his eyes, and can only control the beams with the aid of special eyewear which he must wear at all times. He is typically considered the first of the X-Men, a team of mutant heroes who fight for peace and equality between mutants and humans, and one of the team's primary leaders.

Cyclops is most often portrayed as the archetypal hero of traditional American popular culture—the opposite of the tough, anti-authority antiheroes that emerged in American popular culture after the Vietnam War (e.g., Wolverine, his X-Men teammate).

James Marsden initially portrayed Cyclops in the 20th Century Fox X-Men films, while a younger version of the character was portrayed by Tim Pocock in the 2009 prequel film X-Men Origins: Wolverine, and he was portrayed by Tye Sheridan in X-Men: Apocalypse (2016) and Dark Phoenix (2019) as well as a cameo in Deadpool 2 (2018).

Publication history
Cyclops first appeared in The X-Men #1 (September 1963). He was created by Stan Lee and Jack Kirby, and has been a mainstay character of the X-Men series. Lee said that Cyclops and Beast were his two favorite X-Men, elaborating that "I love tortured heroes—and he was tortured because he couldn't control his power." Originally dubbed "Slim Summers", by The X-Men #3 his name was changed to "Scott", with "Slim" becoming a nickname.

Scott Summers is the first of the X-Men recruited by Professor X; Xavier hand-picks Scott to lead his X-Men, and to carry on the legacy of his mutant-human-harmony ideals. Xavier views Scott as one of his most prized pupils; their relationship exhibits father/son qualities. From time to time, Scott's extreme loyalty to Xavier has cost him dearly in his relationships with others; but, over the course of the characters' publication history, he eventually emerges from Xavier's shadow as the X-Men's undisputed leader.

Dave Cockrum created the Starjammers, including Corsair, and convinced X-Men writer Chris Claremont to use the characters for this series. In order to provide a plausible excuse for the Starjammers to make repeat appearances in X-Men, they decided to make Corsair the father of Cyclops.

Summers remained a member of the team up through The Uncanny X-Men #138. After departing the main cast, he was a recurring character in the series until The Uncanny X-Men #201, after which he was featured in the launch of a new series by Marvel. This new series, X-Factor, launched in 1986 and starred the original X-Men team of Cyclops, Marvel Girl, Beast, Iceman, and Angel. Scott stayed with the X-Factor title through X-Factor #70. In October 1991, Summers returns to the X-Men to launch X-Men #1. This series was the second of two X-Men titles and featured Cyclops, Wolverine, Gambit, Psylocke, Rogue, and Beast as Blue team.  Cyclops has recently been featured in another title launch with the second introduction of a new X-Men series Astonishing X-Men. Astonishing X-Men features Cyclops, Wolverine, Shadowcat, Colossus, Emma Frost, and Beast as a team. Throughout this time, Cyclops continued to make appearances in Uncanny X-Men Marvel has also used Cyclops to launch variant series of X-Men titles most notably Ultimate X-Men and New X-Men.

Cyclops has appeared in limited series including Adventures of Cyclops & Phoenix, Further Adventures of Cyclops & Phoenix, X-Men: The Asgardian Wars, the second series of Astonishing X-Men, X-Men: The Search for Cyclops, his own self-titled series Cyclops, and X-Men Origins: Cyclops #1.

In 1991, writer Brian K. Vaughan worked on the self-titled series Cyclops #1–4. In 2000, Joseph Harris wrote the four-issue run titled X-Men: The Search for Cyclops that dealt with Cyclops's return after merging with Apocalypse in the events of the Twelve from The Uncanny X-Men #377.

During Joss Whedon's run of Astonishing X-Men, Cyclops adopts a new attitude unfamiliar to most accustomed fans.  After Emma Frost's psychic intervention at the mansion, he temporarily loses his powers after owning up to his self-inflicted, traumatic past. This prompted an interview with Whedon in Wizard magazine #182. When asked if Cyclops did not have his powers anymore, Whedon replied:

Now, the X-Men leader has become more confident, outspoken, and audacious. This has had a significant effect on his leadership and his respect among teammates, most notably Wolverine.

However, since the birth of Hope Summers, Cyclops has become increasingly unstable with his own self. Overprotective of those close to him, amoral in his new, Magneto-like view of humanity, and mentally ambiguous, Cyclops is viewed as an antihero and occasionally even a villain in the minds of his fellow superheroes. Kieron Gillen's run in Uncanny X-Men ended with an unrepentant Cyclops, who had become increasingly hardline during Gillen's run, in prison for his actions during Avengers vs. X-Men, up to and including him killing Xavier while under the influence of the Phoenix Force. Gillen wrote him openly suicidal in a five-part epilogue: AvX: Consequences.

As part of Marvel NOW!, there are two Cyclopes: the original Cyclops is featured in volume 3 of The Uncanny X-Men, which was launched in February 2013, and a younger time-displaced version as part of the All-New X-Men team, both series are written by Brian Michael Bendis and drawn by Chris Bachalo. Uncanny X-Men features the remnants of Cyclops' Extinction Team, who have taken up a revolutionary, and sometimes violent course to promote mutant rights, and started up a new school for new mutants, the New Charles Xavier School for the Gifted. The younger Cyclops tries to make sense of his future and find a place for himself, while deciding if he even wants to stay an X-Man.

In the new Dawn of X saga Cyclops has been given the role of Great Captain Commander. The X-Men Senior Editor Jordan D. White said regarding Cyclops role in Krakoa in an interview:

Fictional character biography
Cyclops's history has undergone various revisions, both minor and major. The central fixed element is the character's origin story. As a young boy, Scott Summers is orphaned after watching his parents die in a plane crash. Scott and his brother, Alex, were the only survivors. as their parents placed the two boys in the only available parachute and forced them to jump from the plane just prior to crashing. The boys become wards of the state and are separated. When Scott's powers manifest uncontrollably, he runs away from the orphanage and wanders before being taken in as ward by Charles Xavier.

Youth 
When Scott was a young boy, his father, USAF Major Christopher Summers, took the family for a flight in their de Havilland Mosquito from his grandparents' home in Anchorage, Alaska, when it came under attack by an alien Shi'ar spaceship. As the plane went down in flames, Scott's parents fastened him and his younger brother Alex into a parachute and pushed them off the plane, hoping that they would survive.

In Cyclops's first appearance in The X-Men #1, he is already leading the X-Men under tutelage of Professor X. Later, Scott's origin is first presented in The Uncanny X-Men #38–42 and later refined in The Uncanny X-Men #144 and The Uncanny X-Men #156. In 2010, Marvel released X-Men Origins: Cyclops #1 that describes the character's childhood through his joining the X-Men.

The early accounts in the X-Men comics use flashbacks to tell the origin story of Scott parachuting from his parents' plane.  The flashbacks are often told from various narrative perspectives and place different emphasis on the events of this period.  Scott's poor control over his power have been attributed to events in his childhood. In The Uncanny X-Men #156, Scott's parachute caught fire and Scott struck his head upon landing. This caused brain damage to Scott which is responsible for his poor control over his optic blasts.  Several origin stories do not feature the head injury account with X-Men Origins: Cyclops #1 being the most recent. The head injury account has also been retconned in Astonishing X-Men vol. 3 as being due to a self-imposed mental block he made as a child to deal with the traumatic events of his life. With the help of Emma Frost, Scott is able to briefly bypass his own mental block and control his powers, though he reveals that his control is waning and temporary.

For a time, Scott had prolonged amnesia about his childhood. Parts of his memory returned when he was unexpectedly attacked by the demon D'Spayre while on a leave of absence after Jean Grey's perceived first death. Scott spent most of his childhood at the State Home for the Foundlings in Omaha, Nebraska and was subjected to batteries of tests and experiments by the orphanage's owner, Mr. Milbury, an alias for the geneticist Mister Sinister, who also placed mental blocks on Scott.

Ancestry 
In The Further Adventures of Cyclops and Phoenix limited series, both Scott and Jean were sent back in time to 19th century England by Madame Sanctity, a surviving member of the Askani sisterhood. In 1860, prior to the epilogue of the story, a young English orphan named Daniel (who was freed, one year ago, from the clutches of Nathaniel Essex by Scott and Jean) is shown arriving in New York Harbor from London. As a form of reverence toward the couple who recently showed him great kindness, when urged by his apparent guardian to adopt a new surname at the immigration station, Daniel chooses Summers. Although Scott does not make the familial connection between Daniel and himself, he suspects that his presence in this time (along with Jean's) did something else to affect the course of history, aside from stopping Mister Sinister and Apocalypse.

The X-Men 

When Scott is sixteen, he goes on a trip to New York with his orphanage supervisor. Scott walks near a construction site and his optic beam activates for the first time. The blast damages a metal crane causing it to fall towards an onlooking crowd. Scott thinks quickly unleashing a second blast that destroys the crane. The crowd thinks this is an act of violence, and forms a lynch mob. Scott hops onto a train and runs away. Wandering Scott encounters Jack O' Diamonds who tries to recruit Scott as a thief/villain but eventually battles the villain. Scott is found by Charles Xavier, directly after who erases the crowd's memories. Xavier then asks Scott to join him and the X-Men, he gladly accepts, as the first official member.

In the X-Men's first field mission, he battles Magneto.  With the X-Men, he battles the Vanisher, Unus the Untouchable, the Blob, and many others. Xavier would soon choose him to be deputy leader of the team and act as field leader whenever he was absent.

Cyclops has a relationship with Jean Grey during their time in the "original" X-Men. For a long time, he refuses to admit, even to himself, that he has feelings for her, afraid he would be hurt again or that his optic blasts would hurt her – or anyone else he cared about for that matter – and also because he feels he is no match for his wealthy teammate Warren Worthington III, a.k.a. Angel, who is at first also romantically interested in Jean. What Scott does not know is that Jean actually has a crush on him, but is too shy to make a move. Finally, on Bobby Drake's 18th birthday, they reveal their passion for each other and become lovers.

During one of the X-Men's adventures he rediscovers his brother Alex as his powers were manifesting. Alex would join the team with Scott as Havok.

When the original team of X-Men are defeated by Krakoa, Cyclops is the only member able to escape and return to Xavier. He helps train a new group of X-Men, which includes Storm, Colossus, Nightcrawler, Banshee, Thunderbird, Sunfire and Wolverine to rescue the others. When the other original X-Men (Angel, Beast, Iceman, Jean Grey, and later additions Havok (his own brother Alex) and Polaris) decide to leave in light of the arrival of the new X-Men, Cyclops stays, feeling that he will never be able to lead a normal life because of the uncontrollable nature of his powers.

As an adult member of the X-Men, Cyclops unknowingly meets his father, now known as Corsair, leader of the Starjammers, a group of aliens opposing what they see as the tyranny of the Shi'ar empire. Jean learns of Corsair's identity but keeps it from Scott and several more years pass before he learns his father's true identity.

Cyclops privately questions his relationship with Jean after Jean dies trying to pilot a space shuttle through a solar flare, and then is reborn as Phoenix, feeling that this reborn Jean was not the same Jean he had loved. Yet when he thinks her dead for an extended period of time after a battle in the Savage Land, Scott is not able to mourn her, and believes this meant he did not really love her anymore. He briefly dates Colleen Wing. However, when Scott and Jean are reunited on Muir Island to fight Proteus, he rediscovers his love for her, and they share a passionate kiss on the way home. A few days before Jean dies, Scott psychically proposes, and she accepts. After her death, he quits the X-Men, unsure of what to do anymore. He signs on as crew of a fishing boat, captained by Lee Forrester. After an adventure in which Lee's father is possessed by D'Spayre, Cyclops and the Man-Thing must fight D'Spayre, Scott and Lee find themselves shipwrecked in the Bermuda Triangle, where they stumble upon Magneto's new base of operations.

Scott soon returns to the X-Men. He then discovers that Corsair the leader of the Space Pirate group the Starjammers is actually his father. Scott originally believed that his parents died in the plane accident and is unaware that they, in fact, had been captured and sold into slavery by the Shi'ar. His mother was murdered by then Emperor D'Ken, leaving a grieving Corsair to escape captivity and form the Starjammers. He also finds out through Corsair that he has living grandparents, who own a shipping company in Alaska. During his first visit to his grandparents he meets Madelyne Pryor, a woman who bears a strong resemblance to Jean. Eventually he marries her, and after she gets pregnant he retires from the X-Men. Scott has a difficult time adjusting to life outside of the X-Men and later, to his wife's dismay, he challenges Storm to a battle in the Danger Room for leadership of the X-Men. Despite Storm no longer possessing her mutant powers, she defeats Cyclops. Madelyne gives birth to their son, Nathan, and Scott returns to retirement from the X-Men.

X-Factor and Inferno 
Shortly after the birth of his son Nathan, Jean Grey is discovered and revived by the Avengers and the Fantastic Four. It is revealed that Jean Grey was alive and had never been The Phoenix. The Phoenix is revealed to have been a cosmic entity who placed a dying Jean Grey in a healing pod at the bottom of Jamaica Bay and replaced her taking on her appearance and memories, to the point of not realizing that "she" herself was not the real Jean Grey. After hearing that Jean is alive, Cyclops leaves his wife and son and rejoins the other original X-Men as X-Factor, who pose as mutant hunters but in reality are trying to help their genetic brethren. Meanwhile, Pryor goes on to be an assisting member of the X-Men, apparently sacrificing her life during the Fall of the Mutants with her teammates, although she was left with feelings of despair over the loss of Scott, who felt bad himself over the way he had handled the situation.

The demons S'ym and N'astirh corrupt Madelyne's feelings of self-despair, transforming her into the Goblin Queen. Madelyne seeks revenge on Scott for leaving her. When it is revealed that she is a clone created by geneticist Mister Sinister, essentially for the purpose of becoming a brood mare, Madelyne cannot take it anymore and kills herself.  Scott seemingly kills Sinister with an optic blast, and pursues a romance with Jean, reclaiming his son. Scott soon learns that Mister Sinister ran the orphanage in which Scott was raised, and battled Sinister over this.

Shortly after the X-Tinction Agenda, Scott reencounters Apocalypse, who infects Nathan with a techno-organic virus.  Although Scott saves his son with the help of his teammates and through the combined strength of Nathan, Jean, and himself defeats Apocalypse, he was unable to save his son from the fatal infection.  Distraught, Scott sends his son into the future where he can be cured.

Next, Xavier's psionic enemy, Shadow King, returns to combat the X-Men and X-Factor. After his defeat, Cyclops and X-Factor rejoin the X-Men team, and Scott is named leader of a newly created "Blue Team".

Return to the X-Men 
After Cyclops's return as field leader, much of the Blue team is kidnapped by Omega Red and the ninjas of The Hand. After the captured teammates' rescue, Mr. Sinister sends Caliban, a former X-Factor member, to kidnap Cyclops and Jean for Stryfe, a madman and rival to Cable, both time-lost mutants. Stryfe tells the two that he is Nathan, sent to the future and abandoned. In a fight, Cable and Stryfe apparently die. Afterwards, the team battles Omega Red again, and teammate and telepath Psylocke tries to lure Cyclops into an affair behind Jean's back. Ultimately, however, Cyclops remains with Jean. Cable returns as well and reveals to Cyclops that he is the real Nathan Christopher Summers, while Stryfe is a clone of Nathan created in the event of his death who was stolen and raised by Apocalypse.

Second Marriage 
Scott Summers and Jean Grey finally marry. During their honeymoon, they are brought into the future where they raise Cable for the first 12 years of his life during The Adventures of Cyclops and Phoenix miniseries. After helping Cable defeat the future version of Apocalypse, they are sent back to the past. At the request of Rachel Summers, Jean assumes the Phoenix identity. Mister Sinister, involved with the machinations of Apocalypse and Stryfe and still alive, tells Cyclops that there is another Summers brother, and leaves him wondering.

As Cyclops deals with the fact that his son is now old enough to be his father, the X-Men are forced to battle their mentor when Professor Xavier is transformed into the evil Onslaught, as a result of his recent attempt to wipe Magneto's mind causing Magneto's darker impulses to merge with Xavier's own subconscious darkness and manifest as a new personality. Although the X-Men defeat the evil entity and free Xavier, most of Earth's heroes are lost for a time. Xavier, who is left powerless after Onslaught's defeat, is arrested for his part, leaving Scott and Jean as leaders and co-headmasters of the school. However, the pair go into retirement following Operation: Zero Tolerance, in which Cyclops is gravely injured when a bomb is placed in his chest.

Merging with Evil 
Scott and Jean return to the X-Men sometime after at the request of Storm, when she grows concerned about the mental well-being of Professor X (who had returned sometime prior). Their return then leads to the events of The Twelve, in which Apocalypse plans to use a machine to steal the powers of twelve select mutants and the body of Nate Grey which will make him virtually omnipotent.  In order to save Nate, Cyclops willingly merges with the villain Apocalypse. He is believed dead until Jean and Cable track him down to Egypt and separate him from Apocalypse, killing Apocalypse's spirit in the process.

New X-Men 
Upon Cyclops' return to the X-Men following his possession, his personality has been altered as a result of being bonded with Apocalypse.  This change causes a rift between him and Jean; he claims that Apocalypse made him question not only their relationship, but his life as a whole. He is instrumental in preventing the mutant Xorn's suicide and in recruiting the powerful mutant to the X-Men. The two establish a close friendship; similarly, repeated missions with Wolverine result in the growth of a tentative friendship between the two veteran X-Men.

When Jean begins to show signs of the Phoenix Force again, the distance between the two grows larger and Scott begins abstaining from sex with Jean for the five months. Jean attempts several times to confront Cyclops, but he continues to push her away, claiming that Apocalypse had changed him too much on the inside. Jean, confused by the change in their relationship, confides in Logan and the two kiss in the woods outside the school, but Logan walks away telling her that she should remain with Scott. Xavier leaves Earth while under the control of Cassandra Nova and Jean is left as Headmistress of the school. Her new responsibilities along with her growing powers, force Jean to put her attention elsewhere leaving Scott feeling ignored and his trauma from being possessed trivialized. Instead of attempting to reconcile with her, Scott turns to Emma Frost for consolation, feeling that he can talk to Emma about his problems. Their relationship ostensibly begins as a series of psychic therapy sessions, but the two soon engage in a full-fledged psychic affair.

When Phoenix discovers the affair, Cyclops claims he and Emma shared only thoughts and thus had done nothing wrong. Meanwhile, Emma's snide and mocking jeers provoke a hurt and angry Jean to psychically confront her, using the full power of the Phoenix Force to 'burn through lies'. She forces Emma to admit her true feelings for Scott, and to face her many failures, sins, and personal demons. Furious at both himself and Jean, Scott confronts Jean and demands that she read his mind; Jean finally complies, only to discover that Scott and Emma never engaged in any physical contact, though Emma had offered it. After confronting Jean with the truth, Scott leaves the Xavier Institute, and a short time later Emma is found shattered in her diamond form and believed killed.

Scott soon finds himself at the Hellfire Club which had been turned into a sleazy strip club and tries to get drunk, attempting to escape the responsibilities, expectations, and demands which he feels are unjustly placed on him by the X-Men. He then accompanies Wolverine and Fantomex to the government-created time-pocket called The World and then Asteroid M. During his time with Wolverine, Scott reveals that he feels his relationship with Jean is stagnant and that the two of them had not progressed romantically since their initial teenage romance.  He also confesses that he feels that Jean is so concerned with the school and her new powers that the two no longer communicate like before and that he feels left behind due to Jean once again being connected to the Phoenix Force. When Scott finally returns to the X-Men, their new teammate Xorn (who was revealed to be Magneto, but was subsequently retconned as an imposter) attacks the X-Men. Having at last reached full Phoenix power, Jean confronts Xorn-Magneto and is killed in the process. As she is dying, Scott apologizes for hurting her, but Jean instead tells him that she understands and has never seen him more alive and urges him to live on.

Headmaster 
Scott, however, is devastated by Jean's death, and considers leaving the X-Men once more. It was revealed in the "Here Comes Tomorrow" storyline that, had he done so, it would have led to an apocalyptic alternate future. To prevent this, a resurrected, future-version of Jean uses her powers as the White Phoenix of the Crown and telepathically reached back in time to tell Cyclops it was okay to move on, leading him to start a real relationship with Emma. Together, the pair rebuild the Xavier Institute as co-headmasters.

The new relationship between Emma and Scott leads to problems between them and the rest of the X-Men, all of whom believe that the pair are doing Jean's memory a disservice. Rachel Summers in particular feels hurt and angry by her father's lack of remorse for the psychic affair that hurt Jean before her death and Emma's part in it, and takes on the last name of Grey in place of Summers. The other X-Men eventually come to accept the relationship and both Scott and Emma manage to reconcile with Rachel in their own ways, such as introducing Rachel to Jean's other family members.

Deciding that the X-Men need to play more of a role in emergency rescue and aid, and thus garner attention on mutants in a more positive light where mutant abilities are used for the good of people, Cyclops hand-picks a new team in Astonishing X-Men of himself, Emma, Beast, Kitty Pryde, and Wolverine, which is subsequently used by Marvel as the chief representation of the X-Men. The team faces an alien named Ord of the Breakworld, who supplies Earth scientist Dr. Kavita Rao with a "cure" for mutation. The team subdue Ord and rescue the resurrected Colossus, but not before learning that one of their own will be responsible for the destruction of Ord's homeworld in the coming year. Not long after, the X-Men's Danger Room becomes sentient, attacking the X-Men and seeking to ultimately kill Xavier. Calling itself "Danger", "she" reveals that Xavier knew she had been self-aware since Shi'ar technology was installed in the Danger Room years ago, but chose to ignore her, effectively inhumanely using her only to train his teams of X-Men. After her defeat on the island of Genosha, the X-Men abandoned Xavier in disgust, with Cyclops no longer welcoming Xavier's input at the School or with the team.

Cyclops also tutored a squad at the institute called The Corsairs, named after Cyclops's father. The team consisted of Dryad, Quill, Specter, and the three remaining Stepford Cuckoos.

Astonishing X-Men 
In Astonishing X-Men vol. 3 #14, during an impromptu telepathic "therapy session", Emma Frost presented Cyclops with the possibility that his lack of control over his optic blasts actually stems not from physical brain damage, but from a sort of mental block that the young Scott imposed upon himself after the combined traumas of the loss of his parents, separation from his brother, and shocking manifestation of his powers; this is seen as a coping mechanism, giving Scott something to focus on and try to maintain some sort of control over at a time when events completely out of his control had effectively shattered the life he had led up to that point.

Scott admits that this theory is the truth, further admitting that he had blocked making this decision out of his memory, to preserve the fallacy in his own mind and prevent others from discovering his "secret". The issue ends with Scott apparently in a catatonic state, with his eyes uncovered and displaying their natural shade of brown, with no evidence of his powers manifesting. Later he manifests, and has full control over his optical blasts, although it was only temporary.

Deadly Genesis 

After the events of House of M, nearly all mutants were left depowered, and Xavier was missing. A mysterious villain then attacked and easily defeated several members of the team, including Cyclops and his alternate-reality daughter, Rachel. The two were captured and taken to an undisclosed location, which Cyclops vaguely remembered visiting in the past. Eventually managing to free themselves, Cyclops and Rachel attempted to escape, only to run into their captor (revealed to be Vulcan), who informed Cyclops that he was the X-Man's younger brother. A powerless Professor Xavier confirmed this information in the final book of the miniseries. This new information has left Cyclops resentful towards his mentor and has gone so far as to demand that Xavier leave the school as it is no longer 'his'.

Civil War 

Cyclops, along with the other living original X-Men, declare neutrality on the subject of Civil War, reasoning that the X-Men sympathized too much with Captain America's side – who, like the X-Men, were persecuted for wanting to do the right thing – but believed that the mutant race had suffered too great a loss recently to take a side either way due to the recent depowerment of so many mutants. Bishop leaves the team to join the Registration supporters and locate the escaped 198. In Civil War: X-Men #2, Cyclops under mind control of Johnny Dee helps the futuristic X-Man in recovering them. Cyclops is then manipulated into attacking Bishop which he does by overloading Bishop's power of energy absorption.

World War Hulk 

Cyclops is listed at IGN as a target on Hulk's "Hit List" of characters.  He is seen fighting the Hulk in World War Hulk: X-Men #1 and in issue #2, he uses a full beam blast to stop the Hulk, refusing to let the Hulk take Professor Xavier regardless of his own feelings towards his mentor regarding the truth about Krakoa. While it peels off some of the Hulk's skin, he was able to walk towards Cyclops and clench his entire face, effectively containing the blast. After Hulk left when Mercury told him about the mutant race being near-extinct, Cyclops began to forgive Professor X while the wounded were being tended to.

Messiah Complex 

Cyclops leads a team to Alaska to find the new mutant detected by Cerebro. When the team arrives, they find nearly every child in the town killed, dead Marauders and Purifiers, and the baby gone. He sends a team consisting of Wolverine, Nightcrawler, Angel, and Colossus to find former Acolytes for information on the Marauders. He argues with Xavier, who complains about not telling him about his team. Scott tells Xavier they are not his X-Men any more and that he can do what he wants. Scott also calls in X-Factor to help with the situation, asks Rictor to infiltrate the Purifiers, and asks Madrox and Layla Miller to go see Forge. Upon discovering that Cable has kidnapped the newborn mutant, Cyclops orders the reforming of X-Force with Wolverine leading the team. Their first mission is to hunt down Cable and retrieve the baby. Cyclops later breaks all ties with Professor X and asks him to leave the mansion, as Xavier continues to question Cyclops's judgement. Later on, Cyclops is seen with his own team and X-Factor, to help out Wolverine against the Reavers and to capture the baby from Cable. Cable eludes the X-Men.

After finding the Marauders' hideout on Muir Island, Cyclops dispatches X-Force and Bishop to go there and retrieve the baby. During the final battle, Cyclops sends the New X-Men against the Marauders, believing that Sinister's forces will be caught off guard by unfamiliar opponents. The students prove to be effective. Cyclops then confronts Cable demanding the baby. Cable, with a gun pointed at his father, begs Cyclops to let him escape into the future with the baby. However, Cable gives the child to Cyclops, after Xavier points out that the future of all mutantkind is at stake and Cyclops, as leader of the X-Men, speaks for mutantkind. Cyclops holds the baby and, realizing that the child deserves the chance to make its own destiny, gives her back to Cable. Cable teleports to the future just as Bishop fires a round at the child. The shot misses her and hits Xavier in the head. Cyclops strikes Bishop with an optic blast, and Cyclops declares the X-Men disbanded.

Manifest Destiny 
During the interim period, Cyclops goes on a vacation with Emma to the Savage Land after refusing Tony Stark's request to have the X-Men as part of the Fifty State Initiative. There, they are contacted by Warren asking them for assistance in San Francisco. Scott and Emma are successful in rescuing not only Warren and the other X-Men, but also in rescuing San Francisco as a whole. As a result, the Mayor of the city offers to help the X-Men reestablish themselves in the city. After building a new headquarters, Cyclops sends word to all the world's mutants that San Francisco, which has welcomed the X-Men with open-arms, is now a safe haven for mutant-kind and that all are welcomed to join them. The X-Men's presence is widely approved of by San Francisco, including the police, who now hire the team to aid them in cases that might be out of their area.

Cyclops dispatches Wolverine to track down Mystique and revives X-Force as a clandestine black-ops team whose mission is to take down threats to mutankind that they cannot deal with while under the public eye.  Cyclops places Wolverine in charge of the team and resolutely keeps X-Force's existence secret from the other X-Men, including Emma Frost (manifested as a psychic "black box" in his mind that Emma is unable to open), also demanding that X-Force remain unknown to the public. However, Cyclops utilizes other X-Men for parts of the groups mission, including Beast and the Stepford Cuckoos. The team is sometimes less careful, leaving blood-stained clothing around, piquing Emma's suspicions.  The controversy of Cyclops's decisions as leader of the X-Men is further highlighted during the Skrull invasion of San Francisco when he readily utilizes biological warfare against the Skrulls by knowingly infecting them with an adapted version of the Mutant Legacy Virus created by Beast without first determining if there was also a cure.

In another controversial decision, Cyclops sends X-Force to track down the Leper Queen who is infecting mutants with a strain of the Legacy Virus to use their uncontrolled powers in attacks against humanity in order to stir up anti-mutant hysteria. While on the mission, Beast locates Cable in the future and Cyclops orders X-Force to abandon the current mission and prepare for transport to the future to assist Cable and the baby, Hope. Despite knowing that the Leper Queen has kidnapped and intends to kill Hellion, Surge, and Boom Boom, and despite the protests from both X-Force and Beast that a few more minutes is all that is needed to kill her and save the students, Cyclops makes the difficult decision to activate the time machine. Though Domino is only moments away from killing the Leper Queen, the team is transported to the future and the Leper Queen appears to shoot Boom Boom in the head, while Hellion and Surge are injected and sent to the United Nations building for another attack. Upon his return to the present Wolverine confronts Cyclops on the risks he took in making that decision.

Mutant/Anti-mutant rioting and the return of Madelyne Pryor 
Footage of Cooperstown, Alaska from X-Men: Messiah Complex is eventually released to the media by Simon Trask, designed to deceive the public into believing that the destruction was caused by the newborn mutant messiah rather than the Purifiers. The footage, coupled with Trask's newly formed "Humanity Now! Coalition" pushing anti-mutant legislation, dubbed "Proposition X", aiming to control mutant reproduction, causes an increase in mutant hate crimes, causing Scott to open the X-Men's base to anyone seeking refuge. During this time, his growing secrecy concerning X-Force and Emma's suspicions that he is keeping something from her begin creating a rift between them. Taking advice from Storm that Scott's actions are always in the best interest of mutant-kind, Emma secretly agrees to participate in Norman Osborn's Cabal in her own attempt to ensure the protection of the mutant population.

Scott encounters his dead ex-wife, Madelyne Pryor, again when she inexplicably returns as a psychic ghost, calling herself the Red Queen and with a newly assembled all-female team of mutants calling themselves the Sisterhood. Her team attacks the X-Men and Madelyne steals a lock of Jean's hair in Wolverine's possession, with the goal of using it to locate and inhabit Jean's body, allowing her to be reborn. Scott employs Domino to exhume Jean's grave and swap her body with another.  Unaware of the switch and spurning Scott's attempt to reach out to her, Madelyne attempts to possess the body, but seemingly disintegrates into nothingness as no other body than Jean Grey's can house an entity of Madelyne's level of power.

Utopia/Dark Reign/Siege 
After the battle with Madelyne and the Sisterhood, Beast confronts Scott and Emma, stating that he is aware of both of their clandestine actions and that they will discuss them at length together or their secrets will tear the X-Men apart. In the limited crossover tie-in, Dark X-Men/Dark Avengers: Utopia, the growing unrest among the mutant population and calculated instigation from Trask and Humanity Now! leads to violent rioting from mutants against the anti-mutant coalition in San Francisco. Though supported by the mayor, Cyclops is largely viewed as the leader of the remaining mutant population by the media and he takes the brunt of negative media and public opinion, implicated as endorsing and sending the X-Men to lead the rioting. Trask capitalizes on the hysteria, portraying Humanity Now! as victims of oppression in order to push Proposition X. Norman Osborn utilizes the Dark Avengers to stop the riots and arrest Cyclops and his team of X-Men, calling in Emma to lead a new team of "Dark" X-Men. Emma agrees to lead the team, which will answer to Osborn, as the Black Queen. Marvel writer Matt Fraction indicated that Emma's alliance with Osborn places Scott and Emma at odds with one another, creating "a profound schism".  Cyclops travels to Osborn's base on Alcatraz Island to speak with him. Osborn tells Cyclops that they can end the riots and hysteria here right now but Cyclops interrupts him and orders him to surrender. A shocked Osborn asks what he means, and Cyclops replies that Osborn needs to get the riots under control and then withdraw H.A.M.M.E.R. and the Dark Avengers and leave San Francisco to him and the X-Men. When Osborn refuses Cyclops leaves, telling Osborn that he tried. After Cyclops leaves, Osborn tells Victoria Hand that when the time comes Osborn is going to kill Cyclops personally.

As Emma's Dark X-Men slowly get the city under control, Cyclops continues to form his plans to deal with the situation. Scott assigns his X-Men (such as Mirage, Domino, Mindee Cuckoo, and Psylocke) different tasks, as well as having another team observe Emma's team, as they deal with a group of bio-sentinels attacking San Francisco. When asked how they are expected to take out both the Dark X-Men and Dark Avengers, Scott retorts "Who said you're the squad that's supposed to stop the Avengers?"

Scott's plan finally comes together as he has Magik teleport X-Force into H.A.M.M.E.R's Alcatraz Island, where they take on the Dark X-Men and Avengers, while Magik teleports all the captured mutants to safety. X-Force is aided by Emma and Namor, who are revealed to be double-agents against Osborn. Immediately after, Scott has the X-Club resurrect Asteroid M which crashed into the Pacific Coast a few years prior. Cyclops then orders Magik and Pixie to teleport every X-Man and allied mutant to what he now calls 'Utopia'. During a press conference, Cyclops informs the world that they have left the United States and that they reject Norman Osborn and his methods.

During this time period, Cyclops struggles to define what he wants Utopia to be (nation/base/etc.) Utopia is attacked by numerous threats, including the events of "Necrosha", "Infernus 2", and "Fear Itself". After the discovery of X-Force, Beast leaves Utopia and blames Cyclops for terrible judgement in how he is running Utopia.

When Osborn's illegal siege on Asgard is about to end sooner by the hands of the real Avengers led by the revived original Captain America, Cyclops is one of the non-participating heroes who watches Osborn's downfall live. He is seen watching the said siege alongside Wolverine inside the base at Utopia.

Second Coming and Age Of Heroes 
Sometime after Utopia began, Cable returns to present day Westchester, New York with Hope Summers, the baby believed to be the mutant Messiah. As Cable had no idea that Cyclops and the X-Men moved to Utopia, Cyclops deploys his senior team of X-Men to search and rescue just as the purifiers and Nimrod begin their attack on Cable and Hope. During the rescue, Nightcrawler is killed teleporting Hope back to Utopia. Cyclops holds a funeral for his fallen friend (one of the few who really believed in Scott's belief of the mutant messiah). Beast arrives on Utopia for the funeral and blames Cyclops for the loss of Nightcrawler. Shortly after, an impenetrable field surrounds Utopia and sentinels from the future begin to attack. Cyclops is forced to send a team of X-Men into the future led by Cable, but upon their return Cyclops and Hope watch Cable die from a combination of the techno virus and time travel. After Nimrod and the purifiers are defeated, Cyclops holds a funeral for his fallen son. As Emma Frost witnesses a sign of the Phoenix manifesting in Hope, she runs to tell Scott who dismisses her as he sees he was right all along: Cerebra detected 5 brand new mutant signals. Cyclops deploys Hope to recruit the new mutant signals and they become her team known as "The Lights". Shortly after, Cyclops is awarded the Presidential Medal of Freedom on the request of Commander Steve Rogers for his acts, but subsequently discards it as he wants to focus on doing what is right for the people rather than worrying about how his actions are perceived by others.

Fear Itself 
A possessed Juggernaut escapes Thunderbolts captivity and begins to make his way west to San Francisco to either destroy Utopia or destroy San Francisco, depending on which side would give up the other first. Cyclops deploys multiple attempts to stop the Norse-powered Juggernaut to no avail. As one of his final plans, Cyclops sends Magik, Colossus, and Shadowcat to meet with Cyttorak to convince him to take away the powers he gave Juggernaut. Cyttorak agrees in exchange for making Colossus the new Juggernaut avatar and is able to push Cain Marko back until Cain is summoned by The Serpent.

Schism 
At the beginning of Schism, Cyclops thanks Wolverine for always being there for him as they have finally achieved mutual respect after years of fighting and rivalry. While at a conference for weapon control, Kid Omega (Quentin Quire) launches a psychic terrorist attack on the ambassadors present. In response, sentinels are deployed at the conference and are disposed of by Cyclops and Wolverine. Due to growing fears of mutant threat, countries around the world begin to mobilize their Sentinel forces. Cyclops begins to deploy X-Men around the globe to deal with the threat. Sometime after, Kid Omega shows up on Utopia to plead for amnesty. Wolverine tries to attack Kid Omega when Cyclops stops him. When Kid Omega insults Wolverine, Cyclops defends Wolverine and commands Quentin to be quiet. Later, Cyclops sends a team to a local mutant museum exhibit as a "show of force". The new Hellfire Club attacks the exhibit and incapacitates all senior X-Men present. As Cyclops flies to the museum from Utopia and Wolverine rushes to help, Idie asks if she should kill the Hellfire Club to help. While Wolverine protests against it profusely, Cyclops tells Idie to do what she feels is right. Idie kills almost every Hellfire Club member left to save her friends and mentors. Wolverine pops his claws at Cyclops in anger but restrains himself when he realizes what he is doing.

However, the new Hellfire Club activates a special giant Sentinel, sent towards Utopia. With most of the X-Men far from Utopia and part of the team being in the med-lab, young mutant messiah Hope Summers and other teenage mutants volunteer to join Cyclops in the fight against the super Sentinel. Wolverine is opposed to the idea of putting children on the front lines against the Sentinel; when Cyclops insists that everyone who wants to fight should fight, Wolverine gets a detonator and threatens to blow up Utopia in order to make the youngsters run away from the island and destroy the super Sentinel. Cyclops and Wolverine's frustration with each other come to a head when Cyclops brings up Jean Grey. The two fight each other in a rage while being attacked by the sentinel.

Eventually, the super Sentinel threat forces them to stop fighting each other and join Hope and the other young mutants in the battle against the Sentinel, and the Sentinel is finally taken down. But the ideological differences between Cyclops and Wolverine makes Wolverine decide to leave Utopia and bring along whoever wants to come with him. Both men eventually start recruiting their teammates; some members of the X-Men leave with Wolverine, while part of the team stays in Utopia with Cyclops.

X-Men: Regenesis 
While Wolverine does not leave as an enemy of Cyclops and his X-Men, he makes clear he wants both sides to stay out of the other's business. Various X-Men leave for various reasons; Rogue, for example, departs because she feels that Cyclops has lost perspective and cannot accept the possibility of being wrong. With the X-Men who have chosen to leave alongside him, Wolverine returns to Westchester, New York to open the Jean Grey School for the Gifted while Cyclops organizes new teams of X-Men and remains on Utopia.

Avengers Vs. X-Men 
With the discovery that the Phoenix Force is returning to Earth, apparently to use Hope as a host, Cyclops believes Hope as Phoenix can be used to 'jump-start' the mutant population. Captain America, fearing that the Phoenix will come to Earth and destroy everything, assembles a force of Avengers aboard a S.H.I.E.L.D. Helicarrier and using the S.H.I.E.L.D. cloaking technology travels to Utopia to confront Cyclops. Upon arriving on Utopia, Captain America orders Cyclops to transfer Hope to his protective custody. Assuming that Captain America will not take no for answer Cyclops refuses and uses his optic blast to push the Captain back into the sea. Captain America then orders the Avengers take the beach and apprehend the mutant, Hope. Cyclops denounces the Avengers as having always seen the mutants as 'ugly stepchildren' and will now seek to actively undermine them after they acquired a "messiah". During battle, Hope escapes Utopia. After Hope escapes, Cyclops orders the X-Men to surrender and ends the fighting. Once Magik returns to Utopia, Cyclops directs Magik to use her teleportation power to facilitate the X-Men's escape.

Cyclops scatters the X-Men across the globe with the mission to prevent the Avengers from capturing Hope. Hope seeks out Wolverine for help. Wolverine aids Hope in traveling to the Blue Area of the Moon but then calls the Avengers to inform them of Hope's location. Cyclops and a select group of X-Men arrive to stop Hope's capture. Iron Man fails in his attempt to disrupt the Phoenix Force. As a result, the Phoenix Force is divided and instead inhabits five X-Men present on the moon none of which is Hope. Cyclops, one of the new Phoenix avatars, travels back to Earth with an unconscious Hope. The newly dubbed Phoenix Five begin to transform the world. The world's transformation beings as a utopian society which descends to a police state as the avatars are corrupted by the power of the Phoenix and are unable to control their desires, impulses, fantasies and whims from changing reality. Wanda teleports Hope away and Cyclops declares that there will be no more Avengers.

In defense against the combined assault of the Avengers and the X-Men, Cyclops attacks Emma Frost and absorbs her portion of the Phoenix Force, before killing Xavier and transforming into Dark Phoenix. In pitched battle, the Avengers and X-Men weaken Cyclops enough for Hope to absorb the Phoenix Force into herself. She undoes the changes to the world caused by Cyclops and she and the Scarlet Witch then spread out the Phoenix Force across the globe, causing thousands of people to become mutants. Cyclops is held captive in a ruby quartz cell and while guilt-stricken over killing Xavier, he is happy over the mutant race restarted and claims he would do it all over again.

Captain America convinces Wolverine to visit Cyclops, who is being held in a specialized private prison created for the reemerged mutant population, to learn where his Extinction Team might be hiding. Cyclops baits Wolverine into trying to kill him, but Wolverine lets up once he realizes that Cyclops wants to die and be made a martyr. Once returned to general population, Cyclops is joined by Jake, the only other mutant inmate in the prison. The pair soon realize that all the guards have left as three inmates approach them brandishing shivs. When the inmates move towards Jake, Cyclops tells the inmates to leave him out of this. The tattooed inmate states to Cyclops that their issue is with all mutants as he and the other two inmates attack them. However, due to his training in martial arts, Cyclops was able to defeat the three inmates. After that, he had a talk with Jake who revealed his origin to Cyclops. Cyclops then tells Jake about the Jean Grey School and they might take older students. Later that night, Cyclops uses metal filings to communicate with Magneto and tell him not to break him out as he must stay a prisoner, a political prisoner and he will not let them turn him into a criminal.

Cyclops allows Iron Man to study him for remaining effects of the Phoenix Force. As he is leaving, Jake is murdered by the mutant-hating inmates. Depressed at this action, Cyclops ends up taking up the earlier offer from Magneto to break him out of prison. Magneto, Magik, and Danger break Cyclops out of prison. Before leaving with Magneto, Magik, and Danger, Cyclops has Magik send Jake's murderers to Limbo and has Danger disfigure the corrupt warden by carving an X on his face. The Avengers arrive to find the prison demolished and abandoned except for the warden who delivers a message from Cyclops to Wolverine stating that he will support Wolverine's school and continue to fight for mutant rights, noting that now that Wolverine has taken the role of "the better man", Cyclops can be "the man who does what's necessary". Cyclops, Magneto and Magik watch a newscaster advocating putting mutants in concentration camps. When Magneto asks Cyclops if killing Neanderthal newsmen falls within their purview, Cyclops tells him it does not. Magneto warns him that they are embarking on something completely different now, but Cyclops tells him that he is wrong saying that just like before, they are hated, feared, and saving the world.

Post-Avengers vs. X-Men 

With the X-Men disturbed at Scott's more violent policies — including attacking police officers and various officials for illegally detaining mutants after their powers manifested — but unwilling to actively confront him for fear of triggering a mutant civil war, a chance comment by Iceman inspires Beast to pursue a new solution; he travels back in time to recruit the Scott Summers from the early days of Xavier's School for Gifted Youngsters to convince the present Scott that what he was doing was wrong. It is also speculated that those who either possessed or had strong interactions with the Phoenix Force have had their abilities altered in varying ways. This leaves the present day Cyclops with little to no control over his powers.

It is also revealed that the "Mutant Revolution" and Cyclops in particular have gained popular support among the general public, despite continued distrust and animosity from the Avengers and X-Men.

Later it was revealed that the reason for this alteration was not from the exposure to the Phoenix Force but because they had been infected by Dark Beast with nano-sentinels. Once they removed the nano-sentinels from their bodies, they regained total control over their powers.

New Xavier School 
Cyclops has made a new base in the old Weapon X facility in Canada to train new mutants with Emma Frost, Magik and Magneto. He calls it New Xavier School for the Gifted. It was revealed that Scott, Emma, Illyana and Magneto had been infected with nanite sentinels that had corrupted their powers and caused them to be unpredictable. Cyclops then begins recruiting new mutants for his new Uncanny X-Men. He uses Cerebro to find new mutants and often clashes with Sentinels, S.H.I.E.L.D., the Avengers, and even mutants from the future during the Battle of the Atom.

Storm finds Cyclops's new school in order to tell him that Xavier's last will and testament will be read in Westchester and they will allow him back on the original school's campus again. After the reading of Xavier's will, in which he left everything to the present Scott and noted that he always saw Scott as a son, Scott decided to close the New Xavier School and send all his students to the Jean Grey School, reflecting that he had simply started making threats after all other methods had failed but was now forced to recognize that such an action was not what Xavier would have wanted of him, admitting that he had never had a real plan for what would happen if someone tried to make him enforce those threats.

Cyclops, after finally realizing what his mutant revolution is, gathered mutants at the White House to show humans that the mutants could all gather in one place without creating harm to the human race. Some X-Men were reluctant to appreciate Cyclops's act, while other endorsed him, such as Nightcrawler, his brother Havok, and finally Magneto, who stated that, even if Cyclops's actions seemed insane, Xavier would have loved this.

Secret Wars 
At some point during the future Time Runs Out storyline, Cyclops acquires a Phoenix Egg which he holds in reserve, hoping to use it to end the Incursions.

During the Secret Wars storyline, Cyclops stands on top of the Phoenix Egg during the incursion between Earth-616 and Earth-1610. Cyclops eventually uses the Phoenix Egg to become one with the Phoenix Force again and uses his powers to decimate the Children of Tomorrow, before joining most of the surviving heroes from his universe in their 'life raft', his fellow survivors including Mister Fantastic, Carol Danvers (now known as Captain Marvel), Spider-Man, Black Panther, the new Thor, and Star-Lord. They remain in stasis for a time until they are released by Doctor Strange- who survived the incursions on his own- and meet Miles Morales, the successor to the Ultimate universe's original Spider-Man. Learning that Strange is now Doctor Doom's sheriff, the heroes set out to learn more about where they are now and what's the situation in the present world. Although Cyclops's Phoenix-influenced state initially accepts the new world that Doom has created following the destruction of the Multiverse, he joins the other survivors in attacking Doctor Doom. The Phoenix Force actually allows Cyclops to hold his own for a time against Doom's Beyonder-acquired powers, but the fight ends with Doom breaking Cyclops's neck.

All-New, All-Different 
Following Secret Wars and the restoration of Earth-616, Cyclops was killed during Death of X, when the X-Men discovered that the released Terrigen mists were fatal to mutants upon exposure. Cyclops was one of the first victims of the M-Pox, although Emma Frost used a telepathic projection of him to rally mutant attempts to destroy a Terrigenesis cloud, subsequently faking his death in a final confrontation with Black Bolt to create a détente between mutants and Inhumans so that the two could work on saving mutants while leaving each other alone. Only the Stepford Cuckoos, Havok, and Magneto were aware of Emma's deception (and Magneto aware only because his helmet prevented Emma from altering his mind).

Although the specific details of his death were not known to the public, eight months later, several mutant youths regarded Cyclops as a figure of inspiration for standing up for their rights. This led to problems for the young Cyclops, who is disgusted at what his future self has become and resents the legacy he is seemingly destined to leave. He travels the country hunting down a team of villains calling themselves "The Ghosts of Cyclops" who claim to be fighting for mutant rights, but are really using their powers to steal. It turns out they are just college students and the All-New X-Men come to save them. Cyclops convinces them to turn themselves in rather than fight the police. He vows to not go down the same destructive path as older Cyclops. Storm in particular is recorded as blaming the elder Cyclops for spreading the M-Pox.

With the disappearance of Colossus and Magik at the hands of the Marauders, the X-Men confronted Mr. Sinister only to discover that he was experimenting on unwilling subjects to try to make Inhuman and Mutant DNA co-exist in order to create a genetically superior species of mutants who could survive the Terrigen Mist. To their surprise, Sinister deployed his only successful specimen, the seemingly-revived Cyclops. This Cyclops, however, was soon revealed to be an experiment created by Sinister who combined Scott Summers' genetic material with Inhuman DNA.

When the Phoenix attempts to return once again by resurrecting the adult Jean Grey, it allows her to talk with what appears to be Cyclops' spirit. But after reading his mind about the events that led to his death, Jean simply expresses regret that she was not there to help him and the former lovers apologize to each other for the way things ended before agreeing that they should remain dead. 'Scott' subsequently ages rapidly and dies in Jean's arms, whereupon Jean informs the Phoenix that all she wanted was to say goodbye to her husband.

Extermination 
The entire X-Men team find themselves hunted on two fronts with one group being the mutant-hunter known as Ahab from a dark possible future where he has turned various mutants into his 'hounds' to hunt their fellows, and another being a younger version of Cable, who is so determined to send the young X-Men back to their own time that he actually kills his own future self to stop him interfering, as well as performing 'surgery' to restore Warren's original feathered wings. After Mimic is killed when he acts as a decoy to save young Cyclops, the original five accept the need to return home, but only after taking a detour into the future to meet the younger versions of Ahab's key mutant soldiers, allowing Jean to learn how their powers work. With this new knowledge, Jean is able to program a 'time delay' on the original five's memories once they return to the past, erasing all knowledge of events in the future until they reach that point, simultaneously granting the present Jean with knowledge of how to stop the Hounds. The timeline is thus restored to its original course, with Jean, Hank, Warren and Bobby meeting for milkshakes to talk about their new memories, unaware that young-Cable is talking with a now-alive adult Cyclops.

X-Men Disassembled 
After most of the X-Men who participated the battle, including Legion, Magneto, Apocalypse, Blob and Omega Red are vanished by the hands of X-Man, who plans to reshape the world without X-Men, Cyclops, while keeping his low profile, is seen a few days later reading news of the X-Men's disappearance.

It is explained that his recent resurrection was caused when the younger version of Cable went to find Paul, a human who was rescued by Cyclops from giant robots controlled by the vengeful professor Mavin, back during the original X-Men era, with Paul now working for Tony Stark as a scientist. Cable gives Paul the Phoenix Cage device created by the Avengers back in 2012 to recreate the device so he could resurrect Cyclops. Cable and Paul manage to find Cyclops's corpse after his public 'death', and implanted a smaller version of the Phoenix Cage into the corpse's heart. When Cyclops was temporarily brought back by the Phoenix during Jean's resurrection, the Phoenix Cage is activated and absorbs a small portion of Phoenix Force which eventually restored Cyclops to full life even after the Phoenix abandoned him. After the time-displaced X-Men manage to return to their time, Cyclops gains the extra memories of his past-self, while finding out that the original older Cable had been screwing the timeline for keeping the younger X-Men in the present. Although Cable admits that he brought his father back to life primarily because he saw his death as unfair, he keeps Cyclops contained in his base until the other X-Men are engaged in battle against Nate Grey at the same moment as Professor Marvin escapes prison and goes after Paul for revenge, Cable then forcing Cyclops to choose which of the two he will save. Although the other X-Men are apparently killed by Nate, Cyclops' decision to save Paul allows him to reassess his actions prior to his death and conclude that he had become as bad as his enemies, choosing to help mutants over humans regardless of the consequences. Visiting Utopia, the place where he killed Professor X during the Avengers vs. X-Men event and also where Nate vanishes the participating X-Men, Cyclops vows to find the lost X-Men and restore them to create a brighter future, joined by the resurrected Wolverine, but unable to save Blindfold from committing her own suicide attempts. After defending themselves from Purifiers, Sapien League and Reavers’ attacks, Cyclops and Wolverine went to rescue and recruit Magik, Wolfsbane, Karma, Strong Guy and one of Multiple Man's duplicate from O*N*E compound, including Cyclops’ brother Havok, who turned himself in due to having his crime status when he was affected by an inverse effect back in AXIS event until he got freed during the near end of Secret Empire. However, they are unable to save Strong Guy and one of Multiple Man's duplicate, due to the former sacrificing his life to save the surviving new X-Men team from the virus bomb implanted on the said duplicate by O*N*E. During War of the Realms event Cyclops joins forces with his time displaced younger self's allies Champions to take down Malekith's forces. Eventually, the other X-Men returns from the alternate reality created by Nate Grey and he reunites with Jean Grey for the first time in many years and defeats O.N.E.

House of X
Scott Summers lives on the sovereign nation-state of Krakoa for mutants, created by Charles Xavier, Magneto, and Moira X. When the Fantastic Four captures Sabretooth after he kills several guards during a heist, he shows up to claim him on the grounds of amnesty, though he agrees to leave Sabretooth behind after Mr. Fantastic refuses. He also asks the Fantastic Four to let Franklin Richards know there is a place for him in Krakoa. Later on, Cyclops leads a team of X-Men to destroy Mother Mold and prevent the creation of Nimrod. Though they succeed, they are all killed during the mission. However, the entire team is resurrected by a group of mutants known as the Five (Goldballs, Tempus, Proteus, Elixir, Hope Summers) and are proclaimed the heroes of Krakoa.

Outlawed
Upon learning many pre-adult superheroes have been falsely outlawed by the crusade of Roxxon, through manipulating Senator Geoffrey Patrick and C.R.A.D.L.E., Cyclops, Pixie and Dust rushes to help the surviving Champions and clear Kamala's name from being used for an unjust law. While in Iron Heart's hidden lab, Cyclops inform that Viv Vision is alive, and selling out both of her own teammates and fellow teenage superheroes to the C.R.A.D.L.E.. He tricked C.R.A.D.L.E. into believing the Champions are escorted to Krakoa, and tries his best to find a safer place that is not at Krakoa for them, due to the island restriction. He enlist Bishop, Iceman, Pyro, Shadowcat and Storm to provide the Champions the X-Men's personal pirate ship to live far away from U.S.A.

Powers and abilities
Cyclops emits beams of energy from his eyes, described as "optic blasts", which have the appearance of red light and deliver massive concussive force. His cells constantly absorb solar energy and he can use some of that energy to create an opening to another universe in front of his eyes. The beams fire from these openings. The beams cause no recoil or heat, are tremendously powerful, and can be used to rupture steel plates and pulverize rock, or even punch a hole through a mountain. The beams constantly emanate from his eyes involuntarily, and can generally only be stopped by his own eyelids, or by shielding his eyes with "ruby-quartz", a translucent mineral; Cyclops wears ruby-quartz as lenses in glasses or in his visor, which is generally the only way for him to safely see without inadvertently damaging his surroundings. The beams' involuntary nature has been explained as a psychological shortcoming that resulted from childhood trauma. Cyclops can nevertheless manipulate the beams in several different ways, partially through the use of adjustable apertures in his eyewear that allow the beams to fire through their shielding at variable levels.

In addition to varying the beam width, height, and intensity, Cyclops has demonstrated a high degree of skill and accuracy in manipulating his optic blast. Cyclops is able to reflect the beam off hard and shiny surfaces. This feat also demonstrates his intuitive sense of spatial geometry between objects. The reflective qualities of the beams allows him to bounce the beam off many different surfaces in rapid succession. It has been observed to be focused tight enough to punch a pinhole through a coin, drill through the trunk of a log, and pierce the skin of the Blob. Cyclops has shown the power of his optic blast by blasting through the walls of a hardened building, tunneling through solid rock, and blowing the top off a mountain. Cyclops's force beams were measured by Iron Man to be almost 2 gigawatts. Two gigawatts is about half the peak power output of the Doel Nuclear Power Plant and when Cyclops released this much energy he exceeded his control over his optic beam. With Cyclops unable to shut off his optic beam, Leech came to his aid and negated his mutant power. Against other Marvel characters, Cyclops has been able to use his optic beam to knock Thor's Hammer from his hand. He is known to be able to overload Bishop's energy absorption power and is revealed to never have willingly used more than a small fraction of his full potential due to his anxiety regarding his optic blast.

Early accounts describe Cyclops' optic beams as the product of his body metabolizing sunlight and other ambient energy. This is similar to his brother Alex (alias Havok) who metabolizes cosmic radiation. This metabolized energy is then released in the form of the beam from his eyes. In some stories, Cyclops depletes his body's energy reserves and needs to recharge through exposure to sunlight. When depleted, Cyclops continued to emit the beams; however, their intensity was greatly diminished. One story showed him able to safely open his eyes when in total darkness-without any ambient light to absorb, his power diminished to the point that he did not need his visor.

The original 1983 Official Handbook of the Marvel Universe volume stated that Cyclops' eyes contain inter-dimensional apertures, releasing powerful energies from another dimension into his own via the beams. This account states that his body naturally metabolizes ambient energy that is used to open and focus the apertures in his eyes. The energy of the beam itself originates from this other dimension. This explanation, however, was later changed for the 1986 The Official Handbook of the Marvel Universe Deluxe Edition.

Cyclops's body is naturally immune to the force of his own beams. His mind projects a psionic field that envelops his body rendering it immune to his optic beam, allowing him to shut it off by simply closing his eyes. Scott is also immune to the power of his brother Alex (Havok) who has the ability to emit waves of energy that heat the air into plasma. Likewise, Havok has demonstrated immunity to Cyclops's optic beam.  Scott has been shown as being able to absorb Storm's lightning bolt, although this act caused Cyclops a great deal of pain.  The ruby quartz used in his battle visor has been said to resonate with his body's psionic field. Scott has only limited resistance to his brother Vulcan's powers.

For all Cyclops' skill in manipulating his optic beam, it continuously projects from his eyes whenever they are open and unprotected. To prevent the destruction of any objects in his field of view, Cyclops uses a pair of ruby quartz eyeglasses developed by Professor X and his friend Beast to contain the devastating rays. In his X-Men uniform, he uses a ruby quartz battle visor in place of the glasses. The crystal is said to resonate at the same frequency as the psionic field that protects Cyclops (and Havok) from their own powers. His uniform has firing studs incorporated into his gloves and on the sides of the battle visor that control the visor's aperture. In the event that the visor has a power failure, the apertures are spring-loaded to automatically close so Cyclops can at least see normally. He has also been observed using casual sunglasses and contact lenses made from the same ruby quartz as his visor lens.

Cyclops' poor control over his power is attributed to events in his childhood, initially described as being due to a head wound, disabling his brain's ability to turn off his optic blasts. Later depictions explained that his lack of control is psychosomatic and due to the emotionally traumatic events of his childhood. This later explanation allowed Cyclops to finally control his optic blasts for a short time during a mission on the Breakworld, though at the conclusion of these events, he revealed that he was beginning to lose control again and reverted to using his visor and lenses.

Cyclops' power has been altered by his exposure to the Phoenix Force. His optic blasts are more powerful, now appearing as multiple curved beams. His optic blasts can even cause Dormammu pain. However he would afterward be infected with nano-sentinels that made him lose control over his power even further, to the point that his blasts became inaccurate, activating on their own and becoming even more unstable. The end of the issue concludes with Beast purging the nano-sentinels from both Cyclops and Magik, giving him control over his still altered optic blasts.

Skills
Cyclops seems to possess an uncanny sense of geometry, in this sense used to describe his observation of objects around himself and the angles found between surfaces of these objects. Cyclops has repeatedly demonstrated the ability to cause his optic blasts to ricochet and/or reflect off those objects in a trajectory to his liking. This is commonly called a "banked shot" when applied to this talent. Cyclops has been observed causing beams to reflect from over a dozen surfaces in the course of one blast, and still hit his intended target accurately. It is his sense of superhumanly enhanced spatial awareness that allows him to perform these feats as well. On two occasions Cyclops has been fast enough to blindly predict the position of Quicksilver and Northstar who were moving at superhuman speeds with enough accuracy to hit them with his optic blast. Cyclops is an expert pilot of fixed-wing aircraft, a skill he appears to have inherited from his father. It has also been implied that his geometric sense improves his abilities in the air. Cyclops has spent most of his superhero career as the leader of either the X-Men or X-Factor and has developed exceptional leadership skills. According to Nick Fury's files, Scott's abilities are at their best during tense situations. Fury notes that the less time Cyclops has to think about a decision, the better that decision is. Even when vacationing in the Savage Land, while others enjoy watching two dinosaurs fight, Scott analyzes their strength and calculates how to defeat them by himself. Even Sebastian Shaw has acknowledged Cyclops's skill in taking advantage of the single flaw in the Hellfire Club's defense to reverse a dire situation for the X-Men.  When the other X-Men were hypnotized into thinking Cyclops was the Dark Phoenix and started hunting him down, he thwarted Colossus, Nightcrawler, and Storm in quick succession before fleeing to the Danger Room and creating a jungle environment in which to hide from his fellow X-Men, allowing him to outwit and defeat Shadowcat, Wolverine, Colossus, Storm, and Rogue, all while suffering from broken ribs. In The Uncanny X-Men #150, Cyclops organizes the X-Men to defeat Magneto at a time when the team is denied their mutant powers. Cyclops also has extensive training in martial arts and unarmed combat, including Judo and Aikido. While not a telepath himself, Cyclops has trained himself in various psychic defenses after his relationships with Jean Grey and Emma Frost. As a result, when he was possessed by a fragment of the Void – the seemingly unstoppable evil side of the Sentry – Cyclops was able to use this training to seal the Void in an inescapable prison within his own mind when even Emma Frost had only been able to stop the same Void fragment by turning into her diamond form where she had no telepathic abilities.

During the "Riot at Xavier's" storyline, Cyclops faces off against Quentin Quire's Omega Gang and can be observed doing a cartwheel while firing his optic blast at Radian's leg. In a fight with the Horseman of Apocalypse named War, Cyclops executes an acrobatic flip off a statue in the graveyard and while inverted in mid-air fires his optic blast into the mouth of the robotic mount.

Relationships

Cyclops has had multiple serious relationships and is rarely written without a romantic female relationship. Cyclops' relationships are particularly complicated because of the many retcons involved in the publication history of the Jean Grey and Madelyne Pryor characters.

In terms of publication time, Cyclops's longest and deepest romantic relationship would be with Jean Grey, whom he would eventually marry but not before she would appear to tragically die protecting the X-Men. Grieving from this loss, Scott leaves to the Summers family reunion where he meets and starts to pursue Madelyne Pryor. Scott would become obsessed with Madelyne's similarity to Jean. Madelyne turns out to be a clone of Jean and becomes a supervillain but not before Scott marries Madelyne and has a child with her. A romantic love triangle would later be created when Jean was reawakened from a coma and brought back to life by the Fantastic Four. These relationships would be resolved over the duration of Cyclops's appearance in the X-Factor series.  Asked whether or not Cyclops was really in love with Madelyne, X-Factor writer Louise Simonson answered, "I think she was a substitute for Jean." Uncanny X-Men writer Chris Claremont noted that Cyclops's love for Madelyne was genuine and intended as a means of retiring the character from the team, stating, "It's a metaphor for us all. We all grow up. We all move on."

Jean Grey and Scott finally marry in X-Men #30. Afterward, Scott seemed to have reached a happy ending. Subsequently, Scott becomes possessed by Apocalypse and the lingering effects from this would taint his relationship with Jean. This combined with Jean's returning Phoenix powers creates stress in their romantic relationship. Confused, Scott turns to Emma Frost, who takes advantage of Scott's emotional problems, which leads to a telepathic extramarital affair.  When confronted by Jean, Scott claims that they shared "only thoughts" and that he had done nothing wrong; Jean, however, disagrees and demands that Emma explain herself, but Emma only jeers and insults her. Enraged, Jean unleashes the immeasurable Phoenix ability on Emma, rifling through her memories and forcing her to confront the truth about herself.

In the aftermath, Scott then leaves the X-Men for a time to understand his own conflicting feelings. He returns to tell Emma that he had made a decision between her and Jean, but Jean is killed in battle before it is revealed which woman he had picked. After Jean's death, Scott feels disillusioned with Xavier's dream, leaves the X-Men, and refuses Emma's offer to reopen the school. Had the school remained closed, this outcome would have led to an apocalyptic future. To avoid it, Jean, who was resurrected in this apocalyptic future, used her Phoenix abilities to absorb this future timeline into the White Hot Room. She then mentally pushed Scott past the guilt he felt over her death and made him accept Emma's offer of reopening the school with her.

The two have since been together, although not without problems, particularly in light of the "House of M" storyline in which Emma alienates herself from many people by completely reformatting the school's workings and the events involving the Hellfire Club's return. As of the Divided We Stand stories, their relationship seems to be back on track. The relationship begins to deteriorate again with Cyclops keeping secrets about the actions of X-Force, and Emma not telling him of her agreement to join Norman Osborn's secret alliance known as the Cabal. However, both had their secrets revealed to each other and their romantic relationship seems to be back on track once again, apparently stronger and closer than ever.

A wedge is driven between Scott and Emma's relationship during the war with the Avengers, with Emma and the other members of the Phoenix Five becoming more and more corrupted by the Phoenix Force while Cyclops tries to control his portion as his allies go out of control. In the end, Scott betrays Emma by attacking her and stealing her portion of the Phoenix Force. Following the end of the war with the Avengers, Scott and Emma's relationship has ended.

The time displaced version of Cyclops was in a relationship with Jean, but she ended the relationship when discovering their future. He later began a budding relationship with X-23, prior to leaving the X-Men to join his father, leaving Jean and Laura devastated. The present-day Scott was romantically approached by the time-displaced Jean at one point but he flatly stopped her advances. The displaced Scott has confirmed that he is still in love with Jean, but is unaware of the past Jean's location.

Reception

Critical reception 
In a 2011 poll, readers of Comic Book Resources voted Cyclops as 9th in the ranking of 2011 Top Marvel Characters.

Accolades 

 In 2006, IGN ranked Cyclops 1st in their "Top 25 X-Men" list.
 In 2008, Wizard Magazine ranked Cyclops 106th in their "200 Greatest Comic Book Characters of All Time" list.
 In 2011, IGN ranked Cyclops 39th in their "Top 100 Comic Book Heroes" list.
 In 2014, Entertainment Weekly ranked Cyclops 2nd in their "Let's rank every X-Man ever" list.
 In 2014, BuzzFeed ranked Cyclops 1st in their "95 X-Men Members Ranked From Worst To Best" list.
 In 2019, Comicbook.com ranked Cyclops 25th in their "50 Most Important Superheroes Ever" list.
 In 2021, CBR.com ranked Cyclops 4th in their "10 Bravest Mutants in Marvel Comics" list.
 In 2022, The A.V. Club ranked Cyclops 72nd in their "100 best Marvel characters" list.
 In 2022, Newsarama ranked Cyclops 3rd in their "Best X-Men members of all time" list.

Other versions

Time-displaced Cyclops

All-New X-Men

Beast hoped that bringing the original X-Men into the present would remind Cyclops of why Xavier created the X-Men and prevent a mutant genocide. The original X-Men then decide they want to stay and become the All New X-Men. Both the time-displaced Cyclops and the adult Cyclops join forces when faced with the Brotherhood of Evil Mutants from the future, who come to the present and try to force the Original X-Men back into the past. This results in the Battle of the Atom crossover. When the time-displaced Jean Grey is later kidnapped by the Shi'ar and placed on trial for the destruction done by the Phoenix Force years earlier in the 2014 crossover storyline Trial of Jean Grey, the teenage Cyclops and the All-New X-Men team up with the Guardians of the Galaxy and Starjammers, and rescue Jean from the Shi'ar homeworld. The younger Cyclops learns that his father Corsair is alive, and decides to follow him out to space and leaves the X-Men. He also secretly wants some time apart from Jean Grey, who is showing feelings toward younger Hank McCoy.

In his own spin-off series, young Cyclops enjoys spending time with the father he thought was dead. They get marooned on a hostile alien planet, hunted by dangerous bounty hunters, and are kidnapped by the villainous Space Pirate Captain Valesh Malafect. Cyclops even develops a relationship with the Captain's daughter Vileena.  They eventually meet up with the Guardians of the Galaxy and the All-New X-Men during the events of The Black Vortex. After Secret Wars ends Cyclops leads a team of young X-Men consisting of the time-displaced X-Men along with Wolverine, Oya, and Evan Sabahnur with the hopes of shaking off the legacies left for them by their older counterparts.

Inhumans vs. X-Men
Despite facing his future self's reputation as the man who attempted to destroy the Inhumans with his final act, the young Cyclops nevertheless sides with the other X-Men when they go to war with the Inhumans over the creation of the Terrigenesis clouds.

However, during this fight, young Cyclops is briefly possessed by the body-jumping Inhuman Mosaic, which results in him witnessing a memory Mosaic saw when he possessed Magneto of Magneto and Emma Frost standing over the future Cyclops' body after he died of M-pox. This leads to young Cyclops realizing that his future self did not die attacking the Inhumans, prompting him to vow to go after Emma Frost for what she did to his reputation. He exposes the truth about her actions at the conclusion of the war with the Inhumans when Emma tries to continue the conflict even after Medusa destroys the Terrigenesis cloud to save the mutants at the cost of the Inhumans' future, ignoring Emma's attempts to claim that she did what Scott would have done if he could.

Champions
After becoming inspired by a viral speech made by Ms Marvel, the young Cyclops decides to join the new Champions team. After misreading a situation and attacking Hulk, initially the Champions attack him and restrain him. After hearing his pitch and putting it to a vote they decide to not make the same mistakes made in the most recent Civil War and not judge him for the actions of his future self, agreeing to let him join the team. Due to his experience in leading the X-Men, many of the Champions look to him for leadership. However, a leader is never formally chosen.

ResurXion
After Inhumans vs. X-Men ended, the young Cyclops was determined to return to his own timeline but upon returning to the past, he is crestfallen to realize that their timeline is not the same as the Earth-616 timeline. This knowledge places Cyclops into a stupor as now the time-displaced X-Men do not know what timeline they are originally from. With the new knowledge that they are from a separate timeline entirely, Cyclops and the time-displaced X-Men leave the rest of the X-Men to find their place. After joining Magneto's team of X-Men in Madripoor, Cyclops steps down from leadership and Marvel Girl leads the team.

1602

In the continuity of the miniseries Marvel 1602, Scott is known as "Scotius Sumerisle." He is the leader of the original five X-Men, who are united under Carlos Javier (Professor X) and are known as "witchbreed" instead of mutants.  His powers in Marvel 1602 are identical to his powers in normal Marvel continuity, though he wears a ruby visor instead of a ruby-quartz visor to block his optic blasts. Possessively in love with Jean Grey (who is disguised as a man under the name "John Grey"), he becomes jealous of her friendship with Werner (Angel).

Age of Apocalypse
In the Age of Apocalypse, Scott is a villain who fights against the X-Men. Just like in the normal timeline, Scott and his brother Alex were separated from their parents when their plane was attacked by a Shi'ar spaceship. The two would end up in an orphanage run by Sinister, though in this time line, both brothers were kept by him and raised as his foster children. Unbeknownst to them, their father Christopher Summers eventually makes his way back to Earth, only to be found by Sinister and given over to the Beast (also a villain) for medical experimentation.

Both Alpha mutants, and both holding the rank of Prelate, Scott and Alex Summers dominate the new mutant aristocracy in Apocalypse's America. Sinister employs the brothers to operate his breeding pens, act as security, and sometimes perform as special ops unit. Scott's ability to show emotional restraint in battle earns him Sinister's favor over Alex, fueling a dangerous rivalry between the brothers. This rivalry worsens when the brothers reunite with their real father—Christopher Summers—but are forced to kill him.

Sinister's preference for Scott over Alex also spills over into his genetic experimentation, as with Scott's DNA Sinister plans to create a super-mutant strong enough to destroy Apocalypse. After capturing the X-Man Jean Grey, Sinister believes that he has found Scott's genetic match, and uses their combined DNA to produce a child, Nate Grey.

Despite an initial belief in the doctrine of mutant superiority and even being considered by Apocalypse as a candidate for Horseman, Scott has reservations about the ethics surrounding his work, primarily in terms of excess. These concerns grow substantially once he meets and becomes enthralled with Jean Grey, a prisoner and "race traitor." Though Scott plans to release her on his own time, Grey's lover, Weapon X, breaks in and liberates her himself. Scott fights back against Weapon X, severing Weapon X's hand, but losing an eye in the process. Jean escapes with Weapon X, who remains an enemy of Scott.

In the meantime, Scott increasingly finds himself questioning the treatment of prisoners, and secretly starts releasing them. This does not go unnoticed by his brother Alex, who still harbors hostility against him. Alex re-captures Jean in order to use her against Scott, successfully exposing his brother as a traitor. Although Jean has no love for either brother, she decides to trust Scott and they attempt to escape together. Along the way the two meet Nate Grey, their genetically engineered son, though they remain oblivious to the truth of their connection to him. Eventually, Alex tracks down Jean and Scott, he kills Jean and defeats his brother. In retribution for Jean's death, Weapon X kills Alex by revealing that while Scott blew off Logan's hand, his claws were retracted at the time. According to the records of Magneto, Cyclops was incarcerated for his crimes during the reign of Apocalypse.

When Weapon X ascended to the role of Apocalypse in order to appease the Celestials, he donned the moniker Weapon Omega and started resurrecting deceased mutants using energies from a Celestial Life Seed. Cyclops was one of the first to be killed and resurrected by Weapon Omega. Under the control of Weapon Omega, he became one of his closest men and was appointed his Minister of Famine.

When Penance began rallying mutants to her cause which was to seek forgiveness for their past crimes and to rebuild their world, Weapon Omega sent Cyclops along with Azazel and Colossus to confront and bring her into the fold. Penance refused and used her telepathic powers to break Weapon Omega's hold on Colossus and restored his memories causing him to side with her. She attempted to do the same to Cyclops but he attacked her with his optic blasts before she could do it. A fight broke out between himself and Colossus but Azazel interrupted it and teleported Cyclops and himself away.

After the fall of the regime of Weapon Omega, Cyclops was chased down and killed by Weapon X.

Age of X
In the Age of X timeline, where mutants were hunted and prosecuted, Scott was known as Basilisk; having been captured by the government and his eyelids removed to prevent him controlling his optic blasts. Forced into a mask that could only be controlled by the prison staff, he was used as a mutant executioner on Alcatraz until he managed to escape, subsequently providing other mutant prisoners with the opportunity for freedom, although he is constantly forced to deal with his guilt over his role in the deaths of his fellow mutants.

Amazing Spider-Man: Renew Your Vows
In this continuity, Scott teaches ethics in human-mutant relationships at Xavier's School for Gifted Youngsters. When the Super-Human Registration Act was proposed, Professor X and the Avengers proposed an alternative method with self-policing of mutantkind and super-powered communities. Scott thought it was preposterous for Professor X to make himself the self-appointed representative of mutantkind, and his opposition to Xavier's proposal led Jean to break up with him and marry Wolverine.

Corporal Scott Summers
This version of Scott Summers was raised as an African American slave, who was recruited by Nick Fury and Doctor Charles Xavier who trained him to use his powers. He served in the Union Army during the American Civil War and obtained the rank of Corporal. Due to his efforts along with his fellow black soldiers, James Rhodes and Ororo Munroe, the Civil War ended in merely two weeks. During this period, Scott was stated to have killed about six hundred Confederate soldiers. But despite their efforts and victory, Scott and his fellow mutants were feared by their compatriots.

Scott was recruited by Disembodied Xavier Head to join his inter-dimensional soldiers, the X-Treme X-Force. He faithfully followed X-Force leader Captain Blaire until her death. Afterwards he joined the X-Treme X-Men under Earth-616's Dazzler to continue to hunt down evil Xaviers.

He stayed on Earth-616 after the events of X-Termination.

Cyclops of Bishop's Future Timeline
The Cyclops from the same dystopic future timeline as Lucas Bishop has become dependent on cyborg attachments to stay alive. Initially, Cyclops attacks and blames Layla for causing this dystopic future, claiming that she could have used her powers to help mutant-kind.  However, Layla explains that despite knowing the bad things that would happen to mutants and herself, she still had to allow them to happen and Cyclops relents.

DC Comics Metamilitia
In a pastiche of Marvel's Civil War, an alternative version of Cyclops named One-Eye appears in the DC Comics series Countdown to Final Crisis and its tie-in Lord Havok and the Extremists.

A former student of Doctor Diehard (a pastiche of Magneto and Professor X) and leader of his Zen-Men (a pastiche of the X-Men themselves), he joined the Metamilitia when Americommando became President of the US and approved the "Metahuman Act". Similar to the unfolding of events during Marvel's Civil War, the pro-registration heroes subdued the anti-registration ones; unlike the Marvel Universe wherein Cyclops and the X-Men remained neutral in the conflict, the Zen-Men on the alternative Earth of Angor were besieged by the Metamilitia, who feared their power. Although Doctor Diehard assured Americommando of their neutrality, the Zen Men were interned in a concentration camp and inhibitor chips were embedded in their hands. One-Eye switched sides, joining the Metamilitia out of fear and to avoid detention. After witnessing the rape of the Silver Sorceress (a pastiche of the Scarlet Witch) and the murder of her brother Jack B. Quick (a pastiche of Quicksilver), One-Eye damaged his chip and led the Zen-Men in rebellion.

Earth/Universe/Paradise X
During the events of the alternative future of Earth X, Scott Summers is an old man wandering the country. Summers eventually meets up with the new Daredevil's abandoned circus troupe and trains them into a combat team. When referred to as "Professor," Summers reveals his reservations about the title, stating that he would prefer to be called "Mr. S." Later in the series Summers leads the animen of Wakanda to the Savageland to create a new home for them.

Amalgam Comics
In the Amalgam Comics community, Cyclops was combined with DC's Ray to create Apollo.

House of M
During the House of M, where the main involved heroes' fondest wishes were granted, Scott was married to Emma Frost, and was a pilot for Mutair Airlines.

Marvel Noir
Cyclops appears in X-Men Noir as the leader of the X-Men, a crew of talented criminals. He was involved with the late Jean Grey. He has no powers but wields a revolver, and he has one eye scratched out, ostensibly by Logan who was another lover of Jean.

Marvel Zombies
Cyclops briefly appears in his original form as one of the characters in the Marvel Zombies universe, fighting against the zombified Alpha Flight alongside his fellow X-Men at the X-Mansion in Marvel Zombies: Dead Days. However, like many of his comrades, Cyclops unusually succumbs to the zombie infection and becomes one himself. He also fights a zombie Mystique before reaching the S.H.I.E.L.D Helicarrier. He is also seen standing next to Wolverine, Magneto and Colossus on the S.H.I.E.L.D Helicarrier. The last time he is seen before he is turned into a zombie is when he and all the other uninfected heroes are fighting the zombies to get survivors to safety. At the beginning of Marvel Zombies #1 when Magneto fights the zombified superheroes by launching shards of steel at them, Cyclops is caught in the crossfire and is later seen being shoved away by Wolverine from the corpse of the Silver Surfer. He is then cooked and eaten by the cosmic zombies. As a result, his head has been decapitated by Wolverine and has been ripped out of his zombified body from the same problem as to zombies Wasp and Deadpool (Headpool). On zombie variant covers, he is mostly seen headless and holding his severed head to defeat and eat victims throughout. The zombified Cyclops also appears, as said before, in Marvel Zombies: Dead Days, with zombies Iceman and, ironically, Wolverine.

Mutant X
Scott's history diverged at a much earlier point in the Mutant X reality. In this time line, it was not only the Summers parents who were kidnapped by the Shi’Ar, but Scott as well. While back on Earth, it was Havok who would be discovered by Charles Xavier and eventually grow up to be the X-Men's leader, Scott presumably worked as a slave in the Shi’Ar mines. Eventually, he escaped and joined the Starjammers. Among the group, he also found a lover in Carol Danvers. Unlike his brooding counterpart from the main universe, this version of Scott Summers was a happy-go-lucky space pirate. Eventually, one of their adventures led the Starjammers to Earth, where he was briefly reunited with his younger brother after nearly 20 years of not seeing each other.

New Exiles
 After the New Exiles land on the world of warring empires, they encounter Dame Emma Frost, head of Britain's Department X and founder of Force-X. This team includes Summer Scott, a female version of Cyclops who is codenamed Starbolt.
 On the world of the Sons of Iron and Daughters of the Dragon, the New Exiles face a squad of alternative "core X-Men" who are loyal to Lilandra. These X-Men include an alternative (and bald) version of Cyclops whose codename is "Devo."

Professor W's X-Men
A rather tragic event turned Cyclops into a bitter person in this timeline. At one point, several years in the future, the Shadow King took control of Wolverine and made him kill Professor Xavier. Cyclops never forgave him for this and when, shortly afterwards, Jean Grey was killed, he angrily left the team. In secrecy, Scott assembled a new Brotherhood around himself and one day returned with a vengeance. During the Brotherhood's attack on Xavier's mansion, Cyclops almost killed Wolverine, who did not fight back at all. It was Nightcrawler's daughter, Nocturne, who ended the battle by possessing her teammate, Armageddon, only to use his telekinetic power to pop Logan's claws in Cyclops' chest. To her dismay Scott was stopped but not killed.

Ruins
Scott Summers appears as one of numerous mutants at a prison camp in Texas in Ruins with his eyes gouged out painfully as a result of accidentally killing his own parents.

Shadow-X
New Excalibur battles an evil counterpart of Cyclops, who is a member of the Shadow-X, the X-Men of an alternative reality in which Professor X was possessed by the Shadow King. They are brought to Earth-616 as a result of M-Day. He was later beheaded by Sage.

Ultimate Marvel
In the Ultimate Marvel continuity, Scott is introduced as the straight-laced field leader of the X-Men.  Cyclops's age in the Ultimate Marvel continuity is 18 as of his first appearance. His parents died in a plane crash, and he is estranged from his older brother Alex, with whom he has not spoken since joining the X-Men. Before becoming part of Professor Xavier's dream, Scott dated a young woman named Lorna Dane. Scott is unable to ask his crush Jean Grey on a date, and when she sleeps with Wolverine, Scott leaves the X-Men and joins Magneto's Brotherhood of Mutant Supremacy. Magneto considers Scott a potential heir and urges him to pursue a relationship with his daughter. However, after seeing the lengths to which Magneto will go to fulfill his dream, Scott then betrays the brotherhood

During the Weapon X storyline, when agents of Weapon X are trying to take in members of the X-Men, Cyclops is one of the last X-Men standing, causing serious problems for the ground forces attempting to lay siege to Xavier's Institute. He is taken out only after Nightcrawler teleports behind him and attacks him.

When Jean dumps Wolverine and begins a relationship with Cyclops, the two men argue over whom Jean loves and fight. Xavier sends the two on a mission to the Savage Land to resolve the rivalry. Scott falls into a chasm and catches himself on a ledge. Wolverine catches him, but allows Scott to fall. Cyclops survives, but is severely injured and unable to stand. He survives by eating insects until he is found by a Brotherhood rescue group in search of mutant survivors of a previous Sentinel attack. Cyclops recovers just as the doctors recognize him and takes them out before they can report him.  After recovering, Cyclops contacts the X-Men and proceeds to attack Magneto alone until the X-Men arrive. After Magneto is defeated, Cyclops and Wolverine seem poised for another fight and Cyclops blasts Wolverine with unrestrained optic blast and kicks him off the team. Later, Cyclops finds Wolverine and offers him to return to the X-Men, believing that the school was set up to help mutants and someone like Wolverine needed the help that the school had to offer.

While Cyclops tries to stop Alex from proceeding to the super-criminal prison, the Triskelion, to save Lorna, Alex hits him with a tire iron. Alex claims Cyclops allowed him to do it, because he wants Lorna saved as much as he does.

A few months later, the X-Men are challenged by a new and powerful foe: Cable, who comes from the future to kill Charles Xavier. After defeating the X-Men and seriously injuring Kitty Pryde, Cable escapes to Finland with a kidnapped Jean. Scott and the Professor stayed in the mansion while the rest of the team travel to Europe with help of Bishop, another time-traveler who wishes to stop Cable. The X-Men engage Cable's bodyguards, the Six-Pack. Frustrated by being left behind, Cyclops confronts Xavier, who confesses to his pupil that he is in love with Jean. After this confession, both Cyclops and the Professor rush to Finland. A battle between Cyclops and Cable then occurs with neither able to gain the upper hand, until the Professor distracts Cable so that Cyclops can hit Cable in the neck with an optic blast. Cable then detonates some form of hand grenade, while Charles uses his telekinesis to get Cyclops out of the range of the explosion. After the explosion, all that remains is a skeleton that is believed to be the Professor, while Cable is nowhere to be found.

Cyclops, Storm, and Jean are left with all of Xavier's possessions. Cyclops makes sure that the school will still exist, but since (according to him) Xavier's dream died with him, Cyclops has chosen to disband the X-Men and turn the mansion into just a school. When Bishop challenges Scott's decision, Cyclops tells him to form his own team of X-Men.  After Bishop and Storm leave the institute to start a new team of X-Men, Cyclops takes the role as Headmaster. Xavier later reveals himself to be alive, having been spirited to the future and trained by Cable to prepare for the rise of Apocalypse, and Xavier resumes his position of Headmaster.  Jean manifests the Phoenix and disappears.

Cyclops once again becomes a member of the X-Men. Cyclops acts as a mole for Jean and Xavier to find out who has been supplying the X-Men with the dangerous mutant-enhancing drug, "Banshee." Discovering that it is Colossus, who needs Banshee in order to move his metal form, he joins their team in order to rescue Northstar. He fakes his first injection, but later takes in order to save his teammates as they fight against Alpha Flight. The injection frees Scott allows him to control his optic blasts without the use of his visor, as he remembers when they first manifested and he accidentally obliterated his foster parents. It also allows him to fly. He later remains with the splinter group of X-Men, becoming addicted to banshee and engaging in raids to obtain it. He explains that by using Banshee, his entire body is charged with solar energy and channels it through his entire body, rather than just his eyes, granting him the ability to fly, survive the vacuum of space, and perceive, speak with, and attack Jean's astral form.  He battles against Jean's team of X-Men who are attempting to stop the spread of Banshee, abandoning his original goal of protecting his friends from hurting others. After a short and brutal fight, Jean revives Northstar, who ends the fighting, but Scott chooses not to return with the others, flying into space and landing on the moon. Jean follows him and tries to convince him to come back, but Cyclops refuses. As he Banshee wears off and he becomes vulnerable to the vacuum in space, he states that he would rather die than go back to his former self. Jean convinces him to rejoin the X-Men as their leader and encompasses him in her protective Phoenix fire, and puts his protective glasses back on.

During the events of the Ultimate Marvel crossover event Ultimatum, Magneto's Manhattan tidal wave kills Nightcrawler and Dazzler. Scott, Jean, and Logan go as the "original X-Men" to stop Magneto once and for all. The remaining X-Men along with the Fantastic Four, Ultimates and SHIELD assault Magneto's base, during which they lose several more members including Wolverine, who has his adamantium ripped from his bones by Magneto.  In the end Magneto is defeated when Jean Grey downloads Nick Fury's memories into Magneto, which reveals that mutants are not the next stage of human evolution, but rather a super-soldier experiment gone wrong. Horrified by the truth, Magneto surrenders, and Cyclops executes him with his optic blast.

Soon after, Cyclops is in Washington with the remaining X-Men, attempting to bring a peace to the anti-mutant hostilities and to ask that all mutants surrender to the government. He is then assassinated by Quicksilver, who lodges a bullet into his skull. Scott dies in the arms of Storm and Colossus, while Rogue rushes a distraught Jean to safety.

Ultimate Fantastic Four/Ultimate X-Men Annual #1
In an alternative future timeline of the Ultimate universe, Scott Summers uses the alias of Captain America to fight for mutant justice after losing his powers and Steve Rogers's death. He leads a group of X-Men consisting of Shadowcat, Rogue, Wolverine, and a male member using the codename Phoenix, back in time to try to assassinate Reed Richards of the Fantastic Four, in an attempt to prevent the events following Ultimatum from ever happening. They capture Reed, but are unable to kill him due to his ability to stretch.

It is revealed that their Wolverine was actually a Sentinel impostor, and leads an army of Wolverine Sentinels to kill the future X-Men. Rogue is killed quickly, but Shadowcat and the new Phoenix survive. Scott lives long enough to tell the present day Jean Grey (who united the X-Men and Fantastic Four to save Reed) of the grim future that awaits her, and dies in her arms.

What If?
In What If Mister Sinister formed the X-Men, Cyclops and Havok were raised both by Sinister who formed a team consisting of Cyclops, Havok, Sauron, Sabretooth and Madelyne Pryor (possessed by Malice). Believing the team to be heroes, Cyclops eventually came in conflict with the X-Men and Cyclops and the other team's leader, Marvel Girl, instantly grew attracted to each other. Sensing that he was about to lose Scott, Sinister faked his death at the hands of the Brotherhood of Evil Mutants and asked Cyclops, with his "dying" words, to hold onto Sinister's dream. Scott respected his surrogate father's last wish and rejected Jean's affection, but he and Havok joined the X-Men to secretly undermine them from within.

In What If Scott Summers and Jean Grey had married earlier, Cyclops and Jean Grey marry prior to the X-Men's mission to Krakoa and decide to leave the team with the rest of the original roster following suit. Scott becomes a radio talk show host and author championing mutant rights, however as a result Xavier accompanies the new X-Men team to Krakoa and is eaten by the island along with them. The Avengers are left to destroy the creature, however by this point Xavier and the other X-Men are dead leaving Cyclops feeling intense guilt.

In What If Scott Summers and Jean Grey had never fallen in love at all, Jean Grey actually ends up falling for Angel instead of Cyclops. Because of this, Cyclops never developed into a capable leader but instead withdrew into himself and became more bitter as time went on. As a result, Xavier eventually makes Beast the leader of the X-Men as he does not feel Cyclops is a suitable choice, and in anger Cyclops quits the team and joins Scarlet Witch and Quicksilver in forming a new Brotherhood of Mutants.

In What If Magneto and Professor X formed the X-Men Together, Cyclops alongside Sabretooth and Havok are seen as members of the Marauders and view a battle at the X-Mansion.

In What If: Age of Apocalypse, a timeline where Xavier and Magneto were killed by Legion, Apocalypse was able to rise to power completely unopposed. Scott and Jean attempted to escape his rise to power by hiding out in the Savage Land with their son Nathan, but they were killed by Apocalypse minion Banshee, even as Sauron managed to get Nate to safety.

Old Man Logan
In the "Old Man Logan" storyline, Cyclops is among the X-Men who perish at the hands of Wolverine when he is tricked by Mysterio into believing his friends are super-villains attacking the mansion.

X-Men: Fairy Tales
Cyclops appears as the main character in the first and third short-story installations of a four-part X-Men: Fairy Tales limited series.

Issue #1
This issue is based around the Japanese fairy tale of Momotarō, only with Cyclops being the boy born out of the peach. He is named Hitome, which can mean "one eye" in Japanese. However, his optic blasts come from only one eye, and are stopped by the pit of the peach he was born from.

Until he is around the age when he joined the X-Men in the regular comics, he lives with the old couple who found the large peach, working as a woodcutter, using his blasts to cut down trees instead of an axe.

When an old monk (Professor X) comes running through the woods, chased by thieves, Hitome comes to his aid. The old monk tells a tale of how he is gathering a group of special people like Hitome in order to rescue the Emperor's daughter (Jean Grey), from a group of demons (The Brotherhood of Mutants: Magneto, Scarlet Witch, Quicksilver, Toad).

Along the way, Hitome and the monk gather a team of comrades, some by Hitome's cunning, others by his offers of friendship.

 Issue #3
This issue's story draws elements from Snow White and stories involving witches.

Scott is a poor blind tailor who discovers a beautiful red-haired woman (Jean Grey) sleeping in a glass coffin in the woods. He awakens her with a kiss and takes her back to the village. Logan, a local butcher, confronts Scott and warns him that the woman is more than she appears to be, and that she presents a threat now that she is awake.

Deadpool Corps
In Prelude to Deadpool Corps #2, Deadpool finds a universe where Prof. X runs a school for troubled kids. Cyclops is shown to be a little kid attending there who is constantly picked on by Kidpool.

Ultron future
In Avengers/Age of Apocalypse, Scott is shown as part of the forces Kang is shown using to try and defeat Ultron who has destroyed Manhattan in an alternative future. This version of Cyclops can blast beams out of the back of his head as well as the front.  He was not killed, so the blast was not from an evil robot minion of Ultron's, and Cyclops is shown blasting Ultron at the end of the battle.

Geshem
In the graphic novel Knight of Terra, set in a fantasy world in which Wolfsbane's counterpart is Queen Rain of Geshem, Cyclops's counterpart is Lord Summerisle, commander of the Queen's Guard. Although he has no mutant abilities, he possessed the Basilisk Mask, which simulates his counterpart's optic beams.

In other media

Collected editions

References

External links
Cyclops (Scott Summers) at Marvel.com

Characters created by Jack Kirby
Characters created by Stan Lee
Comics characters introduced in 1963
Fictional activists
Fictional aikidoka
Fictional aviators
Fictional characters from Alaska
Fictional characters from Nebraska
Fictional characters with absorption or parasitic abilities
Fictional characters with disabilities
Fictional characters with energy-manipulation abilities
Fictional characters with neurotrauma
Fictional judoka
Fictional principals and headteachers
Male characters in film
Marvel Comics American superheroes
Marvel Comics film characters
Marvel Comics male superheroes
Marvel Comics martial artists
Marvel Comics mutants
Marvel Comics orphans
Superhero schoolteachers
X-Factor (comics)
X-Men members